Zion Heights Junior High School (now middle school) is an intermediate school for students in Grade 6 to Grade 7 in the north-eastern end (Bayview Woods-Steeles area of Willowdale) of Toronto, Ontario, Canada. It was opened in 1969 by the North York Board of Education, and is currently owned and operated by its successor, the Toronto District School Board.

Student body
As of January 2013, Zion Heights had a student population of 461, with 74% of Zion students speaking a primary language other than English. Many of the students are recent immigrants, resulting in an extensive ESL program. Predominant non-English language groups include Cantonese, Mandarin, Korean, Spanish and Persian.

Academics
Zion Heights is home to many specialized programs. One of them is a gifted program for specially identified students. Another special academic feature is the "Spirit of Mathematics" program, a unique approach to math that has enabled the school to be a winner of many distinguished math awards(both nationally and internationally). Other programs include Basketball Beginnings, Harmony Movement, Kids Now Program, and Junior Achievement.

In 2002, Zion placed second in the Exploravision competition, with their theoretical innovation on the prosthetic arm.

Between 2010 – 2012, 95% of the students enrolled in Grade 9 Academic Mathematics at Zion scored at or above the provincial standard (Level 3) in EQAO. Three grade nine students obtained perfect scores on the University of Waterloo's 2008 Pascal Contest, contributing to a perfect team score. In 2008, 4 students achieved a perfect score on the Grade 7 Gauss Contest and 5 students achieved a perfect score on the Grade 8 Gauss Contest. In 2014 ten students achieved a perfect score on the Grade 7 Gauss contest. In 2012, the strings program won gold at a national contest.

Arts
Zion has maintained an extensive and recognized arts program. Students involved in the string orchestras, concert bands, jazz bands, and choir at Zion participate in many musical events and competitions around the city. The orchestra has participated and won first place in the Kiwanis music festival several times in the past few years. In 2009, Zion's senior stage band won gold at MusicFest Canada and was invited to play in the national competition in May. In 2012, Zion's Junior stage band won gold at Musicfest Canada in the national competition. In 2013, Zion's Senior stage band will win another gold at the upcoming Musicfest Canada. On April 11, 2014, the Senior Orchestra received gold at the Ontario Strings Association competition. Annual school events to celebrate and demonstrate Zion's arts program include concerts, art shows, and dramatic productions.

Athletics
Zion Heights has several athletic teams, such as basketball, soccer, cross-country, volleyball and badminton teams for both girls and boys. The teams are split by gender and grade, junior (Grade 7 and 8) and senior (Grade 9). Zion also has many indoor house leagues, including volleyball, soccer, ping pong, and floor hockey.

Related schools
Students from Cresthaven, Seneca Hill, Pineway, Hillmount, and Steelesview public schools may attend Zion Heights. It is a feeder school for A. Y. Jackson Secondary School. Gifted students could choose to attend Don Mills Collegiate Institute. However, the relocation initiative of the TDSB has allowed gifted students to attend A. Y. Jackson Secondary School for the gifted special education program. The school shows their students' abilities through multiple school-wide competitions and contests, both provincial, and throughout Canada.

Notable alumni
 Corey Haim - Movie actor, for Gr. 8, Graduated 1986
 Henry Lau - Singer, musician, actor, and ex-member of Super Junior-M
 Andreas Vaikla - Footballer for IFK Mariehamn
 Peaches (musician) - Musician
 Gerald Eaton - Musician, The Philosopher Kings
 Nima Arkani-Hamed - Theoretical physicist

References

Middle schools in Toronto
Schools in the TDSB
Educational institutions established in 1967
1967 establishments in Ontario